Tom Warren (born 14 January 1983 in Sevenoaks, Kent, England) is a rugby union player for Gran Parma Rugby in the Italian National Championship of Excellence. He previously played for London Irish in the Guinness Premiership. Warren's position of choice is as a prop.

References

External links
London Irish profile

1983 births
Living people
English rugby union players
Esher RFC players
London Irish players
Rugby union players from Kent
Worcester Warriors players
People from Sevenoaks
Rugby union props